Gecko's Garage is an animated children's television series about a friendly car mechanic named Gecko who helps vehicles, robots, and others who need a helping hand. In addition to entertaining its target audience of children ages 2 to 5, it also aims to help children develop cognitive skills like colors, shapes, and numbers. Part of YouTube's Toddler Fun Learning channel, the show is presented on YouTube, Peacock, Amazon Prime Video, and other streaming services.

History
In 2012, husband-and-wife team Amalie and Christian Hughes of Wirral in northwest England, near Liverpool, developed The Toddler Fun Learning channel to host the educational videos they created for their own 2-year-old, with the key series being Gecko's Real Vehicles. In February 2019 Moonbug Entertainment purchased the Toddler Fun Learning channel, including Gecko's Garage.

In July 2021, NBCUniversal's streaming platform Peacock aired the first season of six episodes.

Actor Martin Dickinson performs the voice of Gecko. Before that, Gecko's voice was performed by Christian Hughes.

References

External links 
 

Fictional chameleons and geckos
Animated preschool education television series
NBCUniversal
CBeebies